The 2012 Jacksonville Jaguars season was the franchise's 18th season in the National Football League. It was the first under the new ownership of Shahid Khan and the first and only season for head coach Mike Mularkey. The Jaguars entered the season hoping to improve on their 5–11 record from 2011 and return to the playoffs for the first time since 2007, but did not and were eliminated from postseason contention. This season marked the third time in the last five seasons in which the Jaguars finished fourth in the AFC South. The Jaguars finished with a 2–14 record, not only tying the Kansas City Chiefs for the league's worst record of 2012, but it would also be the worst in franchise history until the team went 1–15 in 2020. Their 1–7 record at home was also their worst home record in team history.

Roster changes

Notable transactions

Acquisitions 
 WR Laurent Robinson, free agent signed on March 14, 2012.
 QB Chad Henne, free agent signed on March 15, 2012.
 CB Aaron Ross, free agent signed on March 20, 2012.
 WR Lee Evans, free agent signed on April 16 and later released on August 12, 2012.
 RB Jalen Parmele, free agent signed on May 1, 2012.
 DE Jason Babin, claimed off waivers on November 28, 2012.

Departures 

 QB Luke McCown, declared free agent on March 13, 2012.
 DT Leger Douzable, declared free agent on March 13, 2012.
 WR Kassim Osgood, released on March 13, 2012.
 DE Matt Roth, declared free agent on March 13, 2012.
 RB Deji Karim, released on April 27, 2012.
 P Nick Harris, released on April 28, 2012.
 CB Drew Coleman, released on May 3, 2012.
 DE Aaron Kampman, released on June 7, 2012.
 CB Ashton Youboty, released on August 25, 2012.
 WR Chastin West, released on August 25, 2012.
 RB DuJuan Harris, released on August 25, 2012.
 S Courtney Greene, released on August 31, 2012.
 DB Rod Issac, released on August 31, 2012.

Trades 
 Traded WR Mike Thomas to the Detroit Lions on October 30, 2012 for a 2014 fifth round draft pick.

Draft

NOTES
The team traded a 1st round (7th overall) and 4th round draft selection (102nd overall) in exchange for the 1st round draft selection (5th overall) of the Buccaneers.
The team traded a 7th round draft selection (214th overall) to the New York Jets in exchange for free safety Dwight Lowery.
The team obtained a 7th round draft selection (228th overall) in a trade with Cincinnati Bengals.

Undrafted rookie free agents
The following is a list of notable rookie free agents signed after the 2012 NFL Draft:

NOTES:
Promoted to active roster on Oct. 5, 2012.

Final roster

Coaching staff

Schedule

Preseason

Regular season

Note: Intra-division opponents are in bold text.

Game summaries

Week 1: at Minnesota Vikings

Week 2: vs. Houston Texans

Week 3: at Indianapolis Colts

Week 4: vs. Cincinnati Bengals

Week 5: vs. Chicago Bears

Week 7: at Oakland Raiders

Week 8: at Green Bay Packers

Week 9: vs. Detroit Lions

Week 10: vs. Indianapolis Colts

Week 11: at Houston Texans

Week 12: vs. Tennessee Titans

Week 13: at Buffalo Bills

Week 14: vs. New York Jets

Week 15: at Miami Dolphins

Week 16: vs. New England Patriots

Week 17: at Tennessee Titans

Standings

References

External links
 

Jacksonville
Jacksonville Jaguars seasons
Jackson